Chris Taylor is a Canadian video game designer best known for Total Annihilation and the Dungeon Siege and Supreme Commander series and co-founding the now-defunct studio Gas Powered Games. In 2002, GameSpy named him the "30th most influential person in gaming." In 2019, he revealed he has been working on Kanoogi, a cloud-based gaming platform, and developing his next game, Intergalactic Space Empire.

Career
Chris Taylor was born in British Columbia and started in the video game industry in the late 1980s at Distinctive Software in Burnaby.  His first game was Hardball II released in 1989. Taylor moved to Seattle, Washington in January 1996 when he joined Cavedog Entertainment as the designer and project leader for the real-time strategy video game Total Annihilation and its first expansion, Total Annihilation: The Core Contingency. He left Cavedog in March 1998 and later founded Gas Powered Games two months later in May where he designed the action role-playing game Dungeon Siege. Its sequel, Dungeon Siege II, was released in 2005.

In the August 2005 edition of PC Gamer, it was announced that Gas Powered Games was developing Supreme Commander, Taylor's first real-time strategy game since 1997. It is described as the spiritual successor to Total Annihilation, but was not able to be named as such because Atari (formerly Infogrames) owns the rights to the Total Annihilation name. Although Atari has shown no interest in reviving the Total Annihilation franchise, the company nonetheless held on to it until July 2013. He helped create the game's standalone expansion Supreme Commander: Forged Alliance.

On January 14, 2013, Taylor funded a new project through Kickstarter, called Wildman. On February 11, 2013, Taylor shut down the kickstarter for Wildman prematurely. Four days before the campaign's end the pledged amount was only $504,120 of the required $1.1 million.

Shortly thereafter in 2013, Gas Powered Games was acquired by Wargaming, where Taylor was reported to be working on an unannounced project. Taylor left Wargaming in November 2016 with a forward looking statement to be part of indie gaming. On April 24, 2019, Taylor announced the formation of a new cloud-based gaming platform, Kanoogi, and a new real-time strategy game, Intergalactic Space Empire.

Awards
Supreme Commander, released in 2007, has been dubbed "best RTS of E3 2006," the GameCritics Best Strategy Game Award and achieving high ratings from major game websites and magazines.

Games credited
 HardBall II (1989) (designer, programmer)
 The Duel: Test Drive II (1989) (designer, programmer)
 4D Sports Boxing (1991) (designer, programmer)
 Triple Play 96 (1995) (designer, programmer)
 Total Annihilation (1997) (director)
 Total Annihilation: The Core Contingency (1998) (director)
 Dungeon Siege (2002) (director)
 Dungeon Siege: Legends of Arana (2003) (executive producer)
 Dungeon Siege II (2005) (creative director)
 Dungeon Siege: Throne of Agony (2006) (creative director)
 Dungeon Siege II: Broken World (2006) (creative director)
 Supreme Commander (2007) (lead designer)
 Supreme Commander: Forged Alliance (2007) (creative director)
 Space Siege (2008) (creative director)
 Demigod (2009) (creative director)
 Supreme Commander 2 (2010) (lead designer)
 Age of Empires Online (2011) (took over development)
 Chris Taylor's Kings and Castles (cancelled)
 Intergalactic Space Empire (Development started in 2019)

References

External links
 Chris Taylor entry at MobyGames
 Chris Taylor account at Semicolon

Canadian video game designers
Canadian businesspeople
Creative directors
People from British Columbia
Year of birth missing (living people)
Living people